SEA Group (Italian – Societa' Europea Autocaravan; pronounced "sayer") is an Italian headquartered motorcaravan manufacturer, based in Trivolzio, Lombardy.

History
The company was created in 2000 by the merger of three companies: Elnagh, McLouis and Mobilvetta. The group employs 650 people across 11 locations, and produces 13,000 units per annum. It is the third largest manufacturer of motorcaravans in Europe, and has regional offices based in Germany, Spain and the United Kingdom.

In 2004 it was subject to a management buyout financed by Bridgepoint Capital; and in 2005 it took over the British based Auto-Sleepers group.

In June 2009, existing Auto-Sleepers directors Geoff Scott and Mike Crouch acquired 100% of ASG (Auto Sleepers and Marquis Retail), which acts as distributor for all SEA Group products within the UK.

Since January 2013,  S.E.A. became part of the great family Trigano, French company quoted on the Paris Bourse; Trigano is the first industrial group in Europe.

Group brands
Elnagh
Mobilvetta
Mc Louis
Miller

Former brands
Auto-Sleepers
Marquis
Joint
Dream
Sharky
Orian

References

External links
Group website in English

Manufacturing companies established in 2000
Recreational vehicle manufacturers
Motor vehicle manufacturers of Italy
Italian companies established in 2000
Companies based in Lombardy